Gahini is a village and sector in Kayonza District, Eastern Province, Rwanda. The village is the centre of one of the nine dioceses of the Eglise Episcopale au Rwanda, the Anglican church of Rwanda, and one of the four Rwandan sites chosen by the Church Missionary Society, who built a large mission, hospital and schools in the village.

History
Little is known of Gahini in pre-colonial times, but under German and Belgian rule the village became an important transport junction linking the lake with the north-south and eastbound roads. From 1922 the area was temporarily under British control as part of the surveying process for the proposed Cape-Cairo railway, which enabled Doctors Leonard Sharp and Zoe Stanley Smith of the Church Missionary Society, to start missionary and medical work across eastern Ruanda. This land was returned to Belgium in 1924 but the rulers allowed the Church Missionary Society to continue its work, which meant a permanent mission could then be set up. Geoffrey Holmes, a good friend of the Rwandan King Musinga, was in charge of this enterprise and he chose Gahini to be the site. He was joined by Rev Herbert Jackson and Kosiya Shalita, a native of Gahini who had fled to Uganda 30 years earlier, become a Christian, and now wished to return home.

Economy and tourism
Gahini hospital, established by John Edward Church of the Church Missionary Society, is one of the largest in the Eastern Province with facilities including maternity, orthopaedic surgery, HIV treatment, a rehabilitation centre for persons with physical disabilities and an eye clinic used by patients from across Rwanda.
There is cell called video center which is most popular and most economical activities are done there.
The Muhazi lake shore at Gahini is popular with tourists and features two resorts: the Seeds of Peace centre, which offers accommodation, and Jambo Beach. These are used both as stop off points for journeys to or from Akagera National Park, and as venues for lake tourism, offering boating, fishing and bird watching.

Notable people 
 Innocent Himbaza, theologian and hebraist
 Manasse Mbonye, astrophysicist

References 

Populated places in Rwanda
Sectors of Rwanda
Eastern Province, Rwanda